Venture may refer to:

Arts and entertainment

Music 

The Ventures, an American instrumental rock band formed in 1958
"A Venture", 1971 song by the band Yes
Venture, a 2010 EP by AJR

Games 

Venture (video game), a 1981 arcade game
Venture, a strategic card game by Sid Sackson

Film 

 SS Venture, a ship in King Kong and its 2005 remake
 SS Venture, an InGen-owned ship featured in The Lost World: Jurassic Park

Other uses 

Venture (TV series), a Canadian business television show

Magazines 

 Venture Science Fiction, defunct US science fiction magazine
 Venture (magazine), a management magazine

Business
 Business venture
 Venture (department store), a defunct discount department store operating across Australia
 Venture Corporation, a Singapore firm
 Venture Stores, a former retail chain

Transportation
 Chevrolet Venture, a General Motors minivan
 Yamaha Venture, Yamaha touring motorcycles
 Siemens Venture, family of railroad passenger cars

Other uses
 Venture Scout, a section of the Scout Movement, mostly in countries of the Commonwealth of Nations
 VENTURE NOTC, the Canadian Naval Officer Training Centre based in CFB Esquimalt, British Columbia